Tine "Tineke" Netelenbos-Koomen (born 15 February 1944) is a retired Dutch politician of the Labour Party (PvdA) and businesswoman.

Netelenbos attended a Lyceum in Amsterdam from May 1960 until June 1966. Netelenbos worked as a civics teacher in Amsterdam from August 1966 until September 1987. Netelenbos served on the Municipal Council of Haarlemmermeer from May 1978 until September 1987. Netelenbos served on the Labour Party Executive Board from July 1983 until September 1987.

Netelenbos became a Member of the House of Representatives after the resignation of Harry van den Bergh, taking office on 10 September 1987 serving as a frontbencher chairing the parliamentary committee for Health and spokesperson for Education, Social Work, Disability Affairs, Abortion and deputy spokesperson for Culture, Emancipation and Equality. After the election of 1994 Netelenbos was appointed as State Secretary for Education, Culture and Science in the Cabinet Kok I, taking office on 22 August 1994. After the election of 1998 Netelenbos returned as a Member of the House of Representatives, taking office on 19 May 1998. Following the cabinet formation of 1998 Netelenbos was appointment as Minister of Transport and Water Management in the Cabinet Kok II, taking office on 3 August 1998. The Cabinet Kok II resigned on 16 April 2002 following the conclusions of the NIOD report into the Srebrenica massacre during the Bosnian War and continued to serve in a demissionary capacity. After the election of 2002 Netelenbos again returned as a Member of the House of Representatives, taking office on 23 May 2002. The Cabinet Kok II was replaced by the Cabinet Balkenende I following the cabinet formation of 2002 on 22 July 2002 and she continued to serve in the House of Representatives as a frontbencher chairing the parliamentary committee for Health, Welfare and Sport and spokesperson for Education, Culture, Disability Affairs, Equality and deputy spokesperson for Abortion and Emancipation. In May 2002 Netelenbos was a candidate as the next Queen's Commissioner of North Holland but lost the nomination to Secretary-General of the Ministry of Justice Harry Borghouts. In September 2002 Netelenbos announced that she wouldn't not stand for the election of 2003 and continued to serve until the end of the parliamentary term on 30 January 2003.

Netelenbos semi-retired from national politics and became active in the public sector and occupied numerous seats as a nonprofit director on several boards of directors and supervisory boards (International Institute of Social History, Museum De Cruquius, Floriade 2002, Radio Netherlands Worldwide, Electronic Commerce Platform, Royal Association of Shipowners and the Maritime Research Institute) and served on several state commissions and councils on behalf of the government (Netherlands Vehicle Authority, Advisory Council for Spatial Planning, Council for Culture, Cadastre Agency and Public Pension Funds PFZW). Netelenbos served as acting Mayor of Oud-Beijerland from 2 May 2005 until 16 October 2006 and as ad interim Mayor of Haarlemmermeer from 16 October 2006 until 20 April 2007 following the resignation of Fons Hertog and as ad interim Mayor of Ede from 7 June 2007 until 21 January 2008 after the appointed of Roel Robbertsen as Queen's Commissioner of Utrecht.

Decorations

References

External links

Official
  T. (Tineke) Netelenbos Parlement & Politiek

 

 

 

 

 

 

1944 births
Living people
Dutch agnostics
Dutch lobbyists
Dutch nonprofit directors
Dutch nonprofit executives
Labour Party (Netherlands) politicians
Mayors in Gelderland
People from Ede, Netherlands
Mayors of Haarlemmermeer
Mayors in South Holland
Ministers of Transport and Water Management of the Netherlands
Members of the House of Representatives (Netherlands)
Municipal councillors in North Holland
Officers of the Order of Orange-Nassau
People from Haarlemmermeer
People from Zaanstad
State Secretaries for Education of the Netherlands
Women government ministers of the Netherlands
Women mayors of places in the Netherlands
20th-century Dutch civil servants
20th-century Dutch educators
20th-century Dutch women politicians
20th-century Dutch politicians
21st-century Dutch civil servants
21st-century Dutch women politicians
21st-century Dutch politicians